John Seely Brown (born 1940), also known as "JSB", is an American researcher who specializes in organizational studies with a particular bend towards the organizational implications of computer-supported activities. Brown served as Director of Xerox PARC from 1990 to 2000 and as Chief Scientist at Xerox from 1992 to 2002; during this time the company played a leading role in the development of numerous influential computer technologies. Brown is the co-author of The Social Life of Information, a 2000 book which analyzes the adoption of information technologies.

Early life
John Seely Brown was born in 1940 in Utica, New York.

Brown graduated from Brown University in 1962 with degrees in physics and mathematics. He received a Ph.D. from the University of Michigan in computer and communication sciences in 1970.

Career
His research interests include the management of radical innovation, digital culture, ubiquitous computing, autonomous computing and organizational learning. JSB is also the namesake of John Seely Brown Symposium on Technology and Society, held at the University of Michigan School of Information. The first JSB symposium in 2000 featured a lecture by Stanford Professor of Law Lawrence Lessig, titled "Architecting Innovation," and a panel discussion, "The Implications of Open Source Software," featuring Brown, Lessig and the William D. Hamilton Collegiate Professor of Complex Systems at SI, Michael D. Cohen. Subsequent events were held in 2002, 2006 and 2008.

He has held several positions and roles, including:

 Independent co-chair of the Deloitte Center for Edge Innovation (present)
 Senior fellow, Annenberg Center for Communication at USC (present)
 Chief scientist of Xerox Corporation (1992 – April 2002)
 Director of the Xerox PARC research center (1990 – June 2000)
 Cofounder of the Institute for Research on Learning 
 Board member of multiple companies, including Amazon, Corning, MacArthur Foundation and Polycom
 Advisory board member of several private companies, including Innovation Exchange and H5
 Former board member of In-Q-Tel

Honors
IRI Medal from the Industrial Research Institute, 1999
 Design Futures Council Senior Fellow

Honorary degrees

Publications
 John Seely Brown, Douglas Thomas, A New Culture of Learning: Cultivating the Imagination for a World of Constant Change, CreateSpace 2011. .
 John Seely Brown, Foreword, in: Toru Iiyoshi M.S. Vijay Kumar, Opening Up Education: The Collective Advancement of Education through Open Technology, Open Content, and Open Knowledge, The MIT Press 2010. .
 John Seely Brown, John Hagel III, Lang Davison, The Power of Pull: How Small Moves, Smartly Made, Can Set Big Things In Motion, Basic Books 2010. .
 John Seely Brown, John Hagel III, How World Of Warcraft Promotes Innovation; in: Willms Buhse/Ulrike Reinhard: Wenn Anzugträger auf Kapuzenpullis treffen (When Suits meet Hoodies), whois-Verlag 2009. .
 John Seely Brown, John Hagel III, The Only Sustainable Edge: Why Business Strategy Depends On Productive Friction And Dynamic Specialization, Harvard Business Review Press 2005. .
 John Seely Brown, Stephen Denning, Katalina Groh, Laurence Prusak, Storytelling in Organizations: Why Storytelling Is Transforming 21st Century Organizations and Management, Butterworth-Heinemann 2004. .
 John Seely Brown, John Hagel III, Out of The Box: Strategies for Achieving Profits Today and Growth Tomorrow Through Web Services, Harvard Business Press 2002. 
 John Seely Brown, Paul Duguid, The Social Life of Information, Harvard Business Review Press 2000. .
 John Seely Brown (Ed.), Seeing Differently: Insights on Innovation, Harvard Business Press 1997. 
 John Seely Brown, Research that Reinvents the Corporation, Harvard Business Review 1991.
 John Seely Brown, D. Sleemann (Eds.), Intelligent Tutoring Systems, Academic Press 1982. 
 More than 100 papers in academic journals

Translated work 
 John Seely Brown, Douglas Thomas, Yeni nesil öğrenme kültürü: Sürekli değişen bir dünya için hayal gücü yetiştirmek (H. Uysal, Ed. & Trans.; A. Sığın, İ. Çelik, H. Çakmakcı, M. Özdemir, S. Bilgin, & A. Güven, Trans.), Pegem Akademi 2016 (Original work published 2011).

References

External links

 John Seely Brown's website

Living people
21st-century American engineers
Ubiquitous computing researchers
Human–computer interaction researchers
University of Michigan College of Engineering alumni
Amazon (company) people
1940 births
Scientists at PARC (company)
Brown University alumni